ASTAS & SELTAS Shipyards (Turkish: Astaş Aslan Tersanecilik) is a Turkish shipyard established in Istanbul in 1982.

Family business that started with the repair and construction of wooden boats in Haliç-Hasköy in the 1940s. Construction and repair of the steel ships started in 1982.

See also 

 List of shipbuilders and shipyards

References

External links 

 Astas Shipyard

Shipyards of Turkey
Shipbuilding companies of Turkey
Manufacturing companies based in Istanbul
Turkish companies established in 1982